The Leverhulme Medal is awarded by the Royal Society every three years "for an outstandingly significant contribution in the field of pure or applied chemistry or engineering, including chemical engineering". It was created in 1960 after a donation by the Leverhulme Trust to mark the 300th anniversary of the foundation of the Royal Society, and is accompanied by a £2000 gift. Since its creation, it has been awarded 21 times, and unlike other Royal Society medals such as the Royal Medal, it has never been awarded to the same person multiple times. Citizens of the United Kingdom have won the medal 19 of the 21 times; the two foreign recipients have been Man Mohan Sharma, an Indian citizen who was awarded the medal in 1996 "for his work on the dynamics of multi-phase chemical reactions in industrial processes", and Frank Caruso, an Australian chemical engineer, awarded the medal in 2019. Two Leverhulme Medal winners have also won the Nobel Prize in Chemistry: Archer John Porter Martin, who won the medal in 1963 for "his distinguished and fundamental discoveries in chromatography and its application" and the Nobel Prize in 1952, and Cyril Norman Hinshelwood, who won the medal in 1960 for "his outstanding contributions to physical chemistry" and the Nobel Prize in 1956. Anne Neville became the first woman to receive the award in 2016.

List of recipients

References
General

Specific

Awards of the Royal Society
Awards established in 1960
1960 in science